Titan Fighting Championship (Titan FC) is an American mixed martial arts promotion based out of Pompano Beach, Florida.  Their shows were originally run in and near Kansas City and have since expanded to include venues all over North America and eventually, international locations. Since July 2015, Titan FC events are broadcast on the UFC online streaming service UFC Fight Pass, which also showcases a library of the organization's previous events.

History

Founding
Titan Fighting Championships was founded in 2005 by veteran fight promoter and, at the time, Bellator Fighting Championships' director of operations, Joe Kelly. The organization was originally based in Kansas City and was headquartered in the city's historic Memorial Hall, where the organization held the majority of their early events. Memorial Hall was exclusively leased to Kelly's sports and entertainment promotion company Titan Entertainment, from which the MMA organization took its name.

Broadcast deal with HDNet
On December 13, 2010, Titan Fighting Championships announced that they had struck a deal with the cable and satellite television network HDNet (later relaunched as AXS TV) to broadcast their next event, Titan FC 16, live on the network. The event would take place on January 28, 2011, and was headlined by a super heavyweight bout between former two-time UFC Heavyweight champion Tim Sylvia and former The Ultimate Fighter: Heavyweights cast member Abe Wagner.
Prior to the airing of the promotion's second show on the network, Titan FC 17: Lashley vs. Ott, CEO Joe Kelly announced that the organization had signed a three-year extension with HDNet to broadcast their live events under the network's HDNet Fights label. Kelly subsequently resigned from his position at Bellator FC in order to focus full-time on running Titan FC.

Titan FC would initially air a total of nine live events on the HDNet/AXS TV networks, including a "Fight for the Troops" event taking place on June 15, 2012, at the Marshall Army Airfield at Fort Riley, Kansas, and conclude with Titan FC 24: Johnson vs. Jones which aired on August 24, 2012.

Merger with RFA
On October 11, 2012, officials for the Nebraska-based MMA promotion Resurrection Fighting Alliance (RFA) announced that they had acquired Titan Fighting Championships, along with certain fighter contracts, as well as the organization's television deal with, now, AXS TV. The goal was to combine the talent of both organizations under one umbrella, the RFA. Titan FC owner and president Joe Kelly would be brought in as the Vice President of the newly merged company, with seasoned MMA manager, and Black House gym owner, Ed Soares acting as the President.

Resurgence and new ownership
Seven months after the RFA buyout, the Titan FC promotion was resurrected when founder Joe Kelly bought back the organization in 2013 and produced two more shows on his own: Titan FC 25: Lashley vs. Asplund in June, and Titan FC 26: Hallman vs. Hornbuckle in August, both of which were aired live on AXS TV.

In December 2013, Jeff Aronson, the former chairman and co-founder of the fighter management company Alchemist Management, purchased a majority stake in Titan FC from the promotion's founder and president Joe Kelly. Jeff Aronson would serve as company's new CEO with, longtime friend and business partner, Lex McMahon serving as Titan FC's COO. Kelly would remain as the organization's president and minority owner.

Unlike other organizations in the past who tried to go head to head with the UFC and failed, CEO Jeff Aronson hoped to form a professional relationship with the UFC and has attempted to position Titan FC as an unofficial feeder league for the organization. The newly overhauled Titan FC has now focused itself on finding unsigned prospects, and giving top level veterans who have hit a rough patch, a platform on which to get themselves noticed, or get their career back on track.

Along with the new ownership came new rules for the organization's fighter contracts and bonus structure, and an increased focus on fan involvement. As an incentive to get fighters to perform their best, and thus garner the attention of the larger organizations, Titan FC awards "finishing bonuses" to all fighters who finish their fights by either knockout or submission. Also, to entice up and coming prospects and veteran fighters to sign with the organization, Titan FC now offers a no-questions-asked "Zuffa out" clause in all their contracts, in case the opportunity arises for the fighter to leave the organization and sign with the UFC. The organization hopes that these incentives will encourage the fighters to put on a better show for the fans, and intends to increase the fan experience by offering VIP packages and holding giveaways, contests, and autograph sessions at all of their live events. To reflect their new position in the MMA community, and philosophy towards fights and fighter contracts, Titan FC has since adopted the motto "'Fans, Fighters First.'".

Broadcast deal with CBS Sports
On January 14, 2014, Titan FC officials announced that the first show under their new ownership, Titan FC 27: Ricci vs. Gurgel, would now be broadcast live on CBS Sports and that the organization had signed an eight-event deal with the television network. As part of the deal, Titan FC prelim bouts would also be streamed live on the network's website, CBSSports.com. Titan FC officials also announced that CBS Sports had hired top MMA trainer, and TriStar Gym owner, Firas Zahabi and UFC hall of famer Stephan Bonnar to provide the commentary for all Titan FC events. Titan FC 27: Ricci vs. Gurgel debuted on the CBS Sports Network on February 28, 2014.

Titan FC 30: Brilz vs. Magalhães would take place on September 26, 2014, and stands out as being the first time in Titan FC's history that the organization would crown a divisional champion, as two former UFC veterans faced off for the inaugural Titan FC Light Heavyweight title. Four time World Jiu-Jitsu Championship gold medalist and former The Ultimate Fighter contestant Vinny Magalhães would submit wrestling standout Jason Brilz with a guillotine choke in the fourth round to claim this inaugural title.

Titan FC crowned their second divisional champion at Titan FC 32: Green vs. Siler on December 19, 2014. That night Bellator MMA tournament veteran Desmond Green defeated former UFC fighter and The Ultimate Fighter contestant Steven Siler to claim the inaugural Titan FC Featherweight championship.

Over the course of their yearlong partnership Titan FC would eventually air a total of seven live cards on the CBS Sports network, spanning seven cities in seven different states, and culminating in their largest event to date, Titan FC 33: Green vs Holobaugh. Titan FC 33 took place on March 20, 2015, in Mobile, Alabama at the Mobile AeroFest music and art festival, a two-day-long not-for-profit event designed to raise money to support injured U.S. military service members and veterans. The card would feature a total of four separate title fights, three of which would crown the inaugural championships for Titan FC's heavyweight, lightweight and bantamweight divisions; and was headlined by the organization's first ever championship title defense as Desmond Green sought to defend his newly acquired featherweight title.

Broadcast deal with UFC Fight Pass
On June 15, 2015 UFC officials announced that Titan FC has signed a contract with the organization to air all future live events exclusively on the UFC's subscription-based digital streaming service, UFC Fight Pass.

The first event to be held on the service, Titan FC 34: Healy vs. Edwards, aired on July 18, 2015, and featured a total of four title fights, including the crowning of Titan FC's inaugural flyweight champion when Tim Elliott defeated fellow UFC veteran Iliarde Santos for the vacant belt. Additionally, it was announced by UFC officials that the entire Titan FC library of past events would be added to the "On Demand" section of the Fight Pass online service.

Rules

Titan Fighting Championships follows the Unified Rules of Mixed Martial Arts, which were first established in April 2000. The Unified Rules of Mixed Martial Arts have been adopted by every state athletic commission that holds mixed martial arts events throughout the United States.

Under the Unified Rules of Mixed Martial Arts there are no groin strikes, eye gouging, kicking or kneeing a grounded opponent, downward elbows, strikes to the back of the head, head butting, biting, or grabbing the fence. Upon a violation of the rules, referee can either warn the fighter, take a point away, or disqualify the fighter depending upon the regularity and severity of the foul.

Rounds

All non-world championship fights in Titan FC consist of three, five-minute rounds, with one-minute rest periods between rounds.  All world championship fights consist of  five, five-minute rounds, with one-minute rest periods between rounds.

Weight divisions

Titan FC currently uses eight weight classes for men:

Titan FC currently uses two weight classes for women:

Match outcome

Matches usually end via:

Submission: a fighter clearly taps the mat or his opponent, or verbally submits. Also a technical submission may be called when a fighter either loses consciousness or is on the verge of serious injury while in a hold.
Knockout: a fighter is put into a state of unconsciousness resulting from any legal strike.
Technical Knockout (TKO): If the referee decides a fighter cannot continue, the fight is ruled as a technical knockout. Technical knockouts can be classified into three categories:
referee stoppage (the referee ends the fight because one fighter is unable to intelligently defend himself)
doctor stoppage (a ring side doctor decides that it is unsafe for the fighter to continue the bout due to excessive bleeding or physical injuries)
corner stoppage (a fighter's cornerman signals defeat for their own fighter)
Judges' Decision: Depending on scoring, a match may end as:
unanimous decision (all three judges score a win for fighter A)
majority decision (two judges score a win for fighter A, one judge scores a draw)
split decision (two judges score a win for fighter A, one judge scores a win for fighter B)
unanimous draw (all three judges score a draw)
majority draw (two judges score a draw, one judge scoring a win)
split draw (one judge scores a win for fighter A, one judge scores a win for fighter B, and one judge scores a draw)
Note: In the event of a draw, it is not necessary that the fighters' total points be equal. However, in a unanimous or split draw, each fighter does score an equal number of win judgments from the three judges (0 or 1, respectively).
A fight can also end in a technical decision, technical submission, disqualification, forfeit, technical draw, or no contest. The latter two outcomes have no winners.

The ten-point must scoring system is in effect for all bouts in Titan. Three judges score each round with the winner of each round getting 10 points while the loser gets 9 points or less. The only way that an even round can occur is if the fighter that won the round has a point deducted for a foul. Rounds scored 10-8 and 10-7 are typically scored when a fighter wins a round in dominant fashion.

Fouls
The following is a list of fouls outlined by the states that regulate MMA, as established by the Nevada State Athletic Commission:

Butting with the head
Eye gouging of any kind
Biting
Hair pulling
Fish hooking
Groin attacks of any kind
Putting a finger into any orifice or into any cut or laceration on an opponent (see Fish-hooking)
Small joint manipulation
Striking to the spine or the back of the head (see Rabbit punch)
Striking downward using the point of the elbow (see Elbow (strike))
Throat strikes of any kind, including, without limitation, grabbing the trachea
Clawing, pinching or twisting the flesh 
Grabbing the clavicle
Kicking the head of a grounded opponent
Kneeing the head of a grounded opponent
Stomping a grounded opponent
Kicking to the kidney with the heel
Spiking an opponent to the canvas on his head or neck (see Piledriver)
Throwing an opponent out of the ring or fenced area
Holding the shorts or gloves of an opponent
Spitting at an opponent
Engaging in unsportsmanlike conduct that causes an injury to an opponent
Holding the ropes or the fence
Attacking an opponent on or during the break
Attacking an opponent who is under the care of the referee
Attacking an opponent after the bell (horn) has sounded the end of a round
Flagrantly disregarding the instructions of the referee
Timidity, including, without limitation, avoiding contact with an opponent, intentionally or consistently dropping the mouthpiece or faking an injury
Interference by the corner
Throwing in the towel during competition

When a foul is charged, the referee in their discretion may deduct one or more points as a penalty. If a foul incapacitates a fighter, then the match may end in a disqualification if the foul was intentional, or a no contest if unintentional. If a foul causes a fighter to be unable to continue later in the bout, it ends with a technical decision win to the injured fighter if the injured fighter is ahead on points, otherwise it is a technical draw.

Events

Current champions

Title history

Heavyweight Championship
206 to 265 lbs (93 to 120 kg)

Light Heavyweight Championship
186 to 205 lbs (84 to 93 kg)

Middleweight Championship
171 to 185 lbs (77 to 84 kg)

Welterweight Championship
156 to 170 lbs (70 to 77 kg)

Lightweight Championship
146 to 155 lbs (66 to 70 kg)

Featherweight Championship
136  to 145 lbs (61 to 66 kg)

Bantamweight Championship
126 to 135 lbs (up to 61 kg)

Flyweight Championship
116 to 125 lb (53 to 57 kg)

Women's Bantamweight Championship
126 to 135 lbs (up to 61 kg)

Women's Flyweight Championship
116 to 125 lb (53 to 57 kg)

Women's Strawweight Championship
106 to 115 lb (48 to 52 kg)

Combat Grappling Welterweight Championship
156 to 170 lbs (70 to 77 kg)

Kickboxing Heavyweight Championship
206 to 265 lbs (93 to 120 kg)

Notable fighters
Notable fighters who have competed in Titan FC.
Bobby Lashley
Alan Belcher
Bobby Voelker
Michael Graves
Zak Cummings
L.C. Davis
Jay Hieron
James Krause
Rob Kimmons
Tim Elliott
Brett Johns
Anthony Johnson
David Branch
Belal Muhammad

References

External links

Sports organizations established in 2005
Mixed martial arts organizations
2005 establishments in Kansas